Kabul International Airport (known as Hamid Karzai International Airport from 2014 to 2021), also known as Kabul Airport, is located about  from the center of Kabul in Afghanistan. It is owned by the Government of Afghanistan and operated by UAE-based GAAC Holding on behalf of the Ministry of Transport and Civil Aviation. It serves as one of the nation's main international airports, capable of housing over one hundred aircraft. It was locally named as Khwaja Rawash Airport. The airport was renamed in 2014 in honor of former President Hamid Karzai. The decision was made by the National Assembly of Afghanistan and the Cabinet of the then President Ashraf Ghani. It was given its current name in 2021 by the Taliban.

Opened in 1960, the airport has been the primary gateway to Afghanistan and is located at high altitude, surrounded by the mountains of the Hindu Kush. For many years it has been the base of Ariana Afghan Airlines and Kam Air. A new international terminal was opened in the 2000s and at the time a number of military bases were also built around the airport, which were used by the United States Armed Forces and NATO's International Security Assistance Force (ISAF), and later the Resolute Support Mission (RS). The Afghan Air Force also had a base there, while the Afghan National Police provided security inside the passenger terminals. Prior to the withdrawal of NATO's military forces in mid-2021, the airport provided scheduled flights to and from Pakistan, India, Iran, China, Turkey, Russia, Uzbekistan, Tajikistan, and the Arab Gulf states. As of June 2016, the most frequently serviced destination from the airport was Dubai in the UAE, with no fewer than four passenger airlines flying the route, and some with multiple daily flights.

After the evacuation of NATO's forces on August 31, 2021, all civilian flights were canceled and suspended until further notice. A week before that the airport's Abbey Gate had been attacked in a suicide bombing by Islamic State – Khorasan Province (ISIS-K). Following the Taliban takeover, the airport was closed to the public for about a week. On September 26, the Taliban announced that the resulting debris at the airport had been cleaned up, and asked international airlines to resume flights.

History
Kabul Airport was originally built in 1960 by Soviet engineers. The airport was locally named Khwaja Rawash Airport. Foreign tourists began visiting Afghanistan via Kabul Airport. This era ended after the 1978 Saur Revolution, especially after the 1979 Soviet invasion.

The airport was used by the Soviet Army during the Soviet–Afghan War from 1979 to 1989, and by the military forces of the former President of Afghanistan, Mohammad Najibullah. Control of the airport switched between different sides during the civil war after 1992. By November 1996, the Islamic Emirate of Afghanistan governed by Mullah Muhammad Omar was in possession of the airport, until late 2001 when they fled the city after the U.S. invasion of Afghanistan. Due to international sanctions during the Taliban government, the airport was closed in the late 1990s, with very limited international flights.

Following the U.S. invasion of Afghanistan after the September 11, 2001 attacks, Kabul Airport was bombed by United States and coalition forces. After the International Security Assistance Force (ISAF) took over control, the airport began to be developed slowly over the years. A new radar system was installed in 2005, which was upgraded by the U.S. Federal Aviation Administration in 2010.

A new $35 million terminal for international flights was inaugurated in November 2008, built with aid from the Japan International Cooperation Agency. The then-Afghan President Hamid Karzai attended the inauguration ceremony. The new terminal was officially opened to international flights in June 2009. The existing terminal has been refurbished and used for domestic flights.

Passenger movements reached 100,000 per year by 2010 or 300 per day. In early 2012, the radar system was upgraded to cover Afghanistan's entire air space.

In October 2014, the National Assembly of Afghanistan proposed naming the airport after former Afghan President Hamid Karzai, a month after his tenure ended, in recognition of his services and contributions to the country's rebuilding. This decision was approved by the Cabinet of the new President Ashraf Ghani, which renamed the structure as Hamid Karzai International Airport.

The North Side Cantonment – Kabul Airport facility was completed and turned over to the United States Armed Forces in October 2008. It houses the command facilities for the Afghan Air Force (AAF), and includes housing, administrative, operations, maintenance and recreation facilities. The project included two new hangar complexes, a new taxiway and ramps. It is the headquarters and main base (1st or 201st Wing) of the Afghan Air Force. The first hangar facility was turned over to the AAF in January 2008. The second hangar was completed later that year.

2021 NATO withdrawal from Afghanistan 

In July 2021, the Taliban took over many areas in Afghanistan, including those near Kabul Airport. Turkey announced that it would provide security at the airport. U.S. and NATO forces were still deployed at the airport as well. A few weeks later, Kabul fell into the hands of the Taliban, prompting hundreds of people to flee to the airport in an attempt to leave the country. Seven people were alleged to have died at the airport after the crowds consisting of hundreds of people tried to forcibly enter planes leaving the airport. US forces fired in the air to prevent the crowds running onto the tarmac and runways. On 16 August 2021, the US Deputy Security Advisor announced the deployment of more forces to secure the airport. The Pentagon confirmed the head of U.S. Central Command, General Kenneth F. McKenzie Jr., met Taliban leaders in Qatar. The Taliban officials agreed to terms set by McKenzie for refugees to flee using the Kabul International Airport.

Following the fall of Kabul, the Afghan National Army and the Afghan National Police abandoned their posts. U.S. and allied forces subsequently took over the posts. On 16 August 2021, all commercial flights from Kabul Airport were cancelled indefinitely.

On 26 August 2021, more than 100 people were killed in an explosion outside Kabul Airport. The Islamic State of Iraq and the Levant - Khorasan (ISIS-K) claimed responsibility. The last American forces departed from the airport around midnight on 30 August, ending U.S. involvement in the 20-year war. The Taliban subsequently took control of the airport. Rough estimates by the Taliban calculated the damage to the airport at around $350 million. Abdul Hadi Hamadan, the Taliban head of the airport, later stated that the damage to the airport's terminal alone due to the evacuation was $1 million.

Following the Taliban takeover, the airport was closed. Much of its infrastructure had been degraded or destroyed during the evacuation. According to Qatari Minister of Foreign Affairs Mohammed bin Abdulrahman bin Jassim Al Thani, Qatar was to send technical assistance to Afghanistan to help reopen the airport as soon as possible. Mevlüt Çavuşoğlu, the Minister of Foreign Affairs of Turkey, stated that the Taliban and other countries had requested Turkey for help in resuming operations at the airport. The Minister of Foreign Affairs of the Netherlands, Sigrid Kaag, stated that her government was willing to support Turkey and Qatar in reopening the airport. Meanwhile, the security of the airport was handed over to the Al-Fatah Brigade of the special forces of the group on 3 September.

The airport reopened for Ariana Afghan Airlines' domestic flights between Kabul and the cities of Herat, Mazar-i-Sharif and Kandahar, as well as for receiving aid from other countries, on 4 September, following work carried out by a technical team from Qatar, which repaired the airport's runway. Taliban spokesman Zabiullah Mujahid stated on 6 September that Turkey and Qatar were trying to restart all flights from the airport. On 8 September 2021, a NOTAM was issued by the airport's NOTAM office, indicating that the airport is operating between 03:30 and 13:30 Coordinated Universal Time. Additional NOTAMs issued that day indicate that the airports instrument landing system is operative and that the airport's tower is operating again.

A Qatar Airways flight evacuating 113 nationals of other countries from Afghanistan was allowed to land at and depart from the airport on 9 September due to cooperation between the United States and the Taliban, marking the first such flight since the Taliban had completely taken over the facility. Meanwhile, the Taliban renamed the airport to Kabul International Airport, eliminating the reference to former Afghan President Hamid Karzai.

A Pakistan International Airlines flight landed at the airport on 13 September, marking the first international commercial flight to land since the Taliban takeover. Mahan Air resumed flights to the airport on 15 September, marking resumption of commercial flights between Iran and Afghanistan. The Ministry of Foreign Affairs on 26 September announced that the problems at the airport had been resolved and asked international airlines to resume their flights, promising full cooperation.

Facilities

The airport has two terminals: the original that opened in 1960 and a newer building that opened in 2008. The terminal that opened in 2008 is used for international flights; the original 1960 Soviet-constructed terminal is used for domestic flights. Several hangars along the runway are for military aircraft. There are no hangars for civilian (or transient) aircraft. The airport has seven helicopter pads which are used mostly for military traffic. Fire fighting equipment is present.

Airlines and destinations

Transportation
Buses, taxi and private cars provide transportation to and from the airport. A four-lane highway connects the airport to Kabul.

Accidents and incidents

Civilian
 On 2 January 1962, Iran Air Flight 123, a Douglas DC-3 on a cargo flight, crashed while attempting to take-off from Kabul. During the take-off roll the captain noticed a malfunction in the number 1 engine followed by the aircraft veering to the left of the runway. To avoid a crash, the captain pulled the aircraft up into the air, but while attempting to turn the aircraft away from the airport, a wing struck the ground followed by a crash. Both crew members survived.
 On 15 January 1969, Douglas DC-3 YA-AAB of Ariana Afghan Airlines was damaged beyond economic repair in a ground collision with Douglas DC-6 YA-DAN, also of Ariana.
 On 21 September 1984, a McDonnell Douglas DC-10-30 of Ariana Afghan Airlines was hit by explosive bullets while on approach to Kabul Airport. All passengers and crew survived the incident.
 On 12 June 1990, an Ilyushin Il-76 of Aeroflot was struck by a missile while flying at  causing two engines to shut down. The aircraft made a forced landing in Kabul with no flaps on an unpaved runway. All 10 crew survived.
 On 29 May 1992, an Ariana Afghan Airlines Tupolev Tu-154 was struck by a missile while landing at Kabul. The nose of the aircraft was damaged but it landed safely. All passengers and crew survived.
 On 19 March 1998, a Boeing 727-200 of Ariana Afghan Airlines crashed into the  Sharki Baratayi mountain while descending into Kabul. All 10 crew and 35 passengers on board died.
 On 3 February 2005, Kam Air Flight 904, a Boeing 737-200 operated by Phoenix Aviation, vanished from radar screens on approach to Kabul in poor weather, sparking a massive Afghan National Army search operation for the 96 passengers and 8 crew. The wreckage of the aircraft was found two days later in the mountains east of Kabul, all 104 people on board had been killed.
On 17 May 2010, all contact with Pamir Airways Flight 112, an Antonov An-24 operated by Pamir Airways, was lost ten minutes after departure from Kunduz Airport. None of the 39 passengers and five crew on board the flight survived the crash.
On 8 May 2014, Ariana Afghan Airlines Flight 312, a Boeing 737-400, ran off the runway after landing at the airport. Flight 312 originated in Delhi, India and operated on a scheduled passenger service to Kabul. On landing the aircraft overshot runway 29, coming to rest on uneven terrain. The aircraft was heavily damaged and six passengers were slightly injured.

Military
 On 11 March 1985, an Antonov An-30 of the Soviet Air Force was on an aerial photography flight in the Kabul area south of the Panjshir Valley. Upon returning to the airport, the aircraft was struck by a Strela missile. The captain tried to make an emergency landing at Bagram Airbase but was too high. A fire ignited by the missile strike then reached the aileron controls causing the pilots to lose control; three of the five crew members evacuated the aircraft safely, but the other two crew members died.
 On 29 November 1986, a Soviet Air Force Antonov An-26 was hit by a Stinger missile while climbing out of Kabul. The aircraft was carrying several tons of S-24 rockets and 400 kg of explosives to Jalalabad in Afghanistan. All seven crew members perished.
 On 21 October 1987, a Soviet Air Force Antonov An-12BK collided with a Mil Mi-24 helicopter while taking off in poor visibility. The aircraft was heading for the capital city of then Uzbek Soviet Socialist Republic, Tashkent; 18 of the 19 passengers and crew died.
 On 21 December 1987, a Soviet Air Force Antonov An-26 was hit by a Stinger missile while circling to a safe altitude shortly after take-off. The number one engine was hit, puncturing the fuel tank. Smoke entered the cabin. All six crew members parachuted out; the captain jumped too close to the ground to open his parachute and died upon impact.
 On 24 June 1988, a Soviet Air Force Antonov An-26 was hit by bullets fired from Mujahideen rebels. The aircraft crashed in Kabul, killing one of the six crew members on board.
 On 28 August 1992, a Soviet Air Force Ilyushin Il-76MD was hit by a renegade Mujahideen rocket while boarding Russian embassy staff.
 On 5 August 2008, a Lockheed C-130H Hercules of the United Arab Emirates Air Force overran the runway upon landing in Kabul, causing a fire in the forward section of the aircraft. The aircraft was carrying aid to Afghanistan. All crew members survived.
 On 16 August 2021, as a Boeing C-17 Globemaster III of the United States Air Force was taking off, crowds of people trying to escape the 2021 Taliban offensive were seen running alongside and clinging onto the aircraft. The aircraft lifted up into the air with people still holding on, with at least two dying after falling from the aircraft and an unknown number possibly crushed and killed by the landing gear retracting; human remains were found in the wheel well. The incident was widely reported in U.S. and international media.

Non-aircraft related
 On 31 August 1984, Afghan guerillas exploded a bomb at the airport where several Aeroflot planes were picking up passengers, killing 28 people and wounding 350 others.
 On 8 September 2009, at around 8:22 AM local time, a suicide bombing took place near the entrance of the airport's military base.
On 3 July 2014, Taliban fighters fired two rockets into the airport, destroying four helicopters. One of the four helicopters belonged to Afghan President Hamid Karzai.
 On 29 January 2015, three American defense contractors and one Afghan national were killed by a gunman outside the airport in late evening local time.
 On 17 May 2015, a suicide bombing by the Taliban near the entrance of the airport occurred, killing three and injuring eighteen.
 On 26 August 2021, more than 185 people were killed, including at least 13 U.S. service members and 90 Afghans, at the Kabul airport when two ISIS-K suicide bombers ripped through crowds trying to enter the American-controlled facility, disrupting the final push of the U.S.-led evacuation effort. The bombs were set off near a crowd of families at the airport gates who were desperately hoping to make one of the last evacuation flights out. Gunfire was reported in the aftermath of the explosions.
On 29 August 2021, smoke was seen rising from two explosions which occurred near the airport, one of which killed a child. Explosions occurred hours after U.S. President Joe Biden warned of another terrorist attack in Kabul.
On 30 August 2021, thermite bombs were used to disable several counter rocket, artillery and mortar systems used to protect the airfield from incoming ISIS-K fired rockets.

See also
 List of airports in Afghanistan

References

External links

 Official Kabul International Airport website 
 PDF on rebuilding the airport
 UK Ministry of Defence Images of KBL
 
 
 

1960 establishments in Afghanistan
Airports established in 1960
Airports in Afghanistan
Airport
Airport
Military installations of Afghanistan
Military installations of Turkey
Military installations of the United States in Afghanistan
Military installations of the Soviet Union in other countries
Soviet foreign aid
Afghanistan–Soviet Union relations
Afghanistan–United States relations
Afghanistan–Turkey relations
Airport